The New Deal coalition was an American political coalition that supported the Democratic Party beginning in 1932. The coalition is named after President Franklin D. Roosevelt's New Deal programs, and the follow-up Democratic presidents. It was composed of voting blocs who supported them. The coalition included labor unions, blue-collar workers, racial and religious minorities (especially Jews, Catholics, and African-Americans), rural white Southerners, and intellectuals. Besides voters the coalition included powerful interest groups: Democratic party organizations in most states, city machines, labor unions, some third parties, universities, and foundations.  It was largely opposed by the Republican Party, the business community, and rich Protestants.  In creating his coalition, Roosevelt was at first eager to include liberal Republicans and some radical third parties, even if it meant downplaying the "Democratic" name. Consequently, the California experience helped push New Deal towards social welfare legislation, especially the WPA and Social Security. Sinclair's campaign gave aspiring Democratic leaders a boost, most notably Culbert Olson, who was elected governor in 1938. Needing an alternative to the New Deal's Social Security system, many Republicans around the country endorsed the Townsend Plan.

Class ethnicity, and religion 
In the North, class and ethnicity proved decisive factors in the New Deal coalition as shown by polling data in presidential and congressional elections from 1936 through 1968.  Blue collar workers average 63% Democratic. White collar workers, representing the middle class, averaged 43% Democratic. In terms of religion northern White Protestants were 42% Democratic, White Catholics were 68% Democratic. Social class and religious affiliation added had separate effects that could add together, so that Catholic blue collar workers were 76% Democratic, while Protestant blue collar workers were only 52% Democratic. Throughout the period better educated higher income middle-class voters were more Republican so that the average Northern Protestant white collar voter was 69% Republican, while a Catholic counterpart was only 41% Republican.  A Gallup poll of listees in Who's Who in early 1936 showed that only 31% planned to vote for Roosevelt.  Nationwide, Roosevelt won 36% of the votes of business and professional voters in 1940, 48% of lower level white collar workers, 66% of blue collar workers, and 54% of farmers.
The strongest component of the New Deal coalition were the ethnic groups: Here is the distribution of party identification in 1944:

The coalition was strongest among Jews and Catholics and weakest among White Protestants.

Labor unions

The New Dealers made a major, successful effort to build up labor unions, especially through the National Labor Relations Act of 1935. In addition, Democratic-led state governments were much more favorable to unions than the pro-business Republicans had been. In 1940 FDR won 64% of non-union manual workers, 71% of AFL members, and 79% of CIO members.  Union membership grew rapidly during World War II. In 1944 FDR won 56% of non-union manual workers, 69% of AFL members, and 79% of CIO members. Truman in 1948 had similar results.
The more militant industrial unions, led by John L. Lewis formed the Congress of Industrial Organizations (CIO), and split off from the more traditional American Federation of Labor in 1938. Both federations added members rapidly, but they feuded bitterly. Both supported Roosevelt and the New Deal Coalition. The nationwide wave of labor strikes in 1937-38 alienated many voters, and the split weakened the New Deal coalition.  The most controversial labor leader was John L. Lewis, head of the coal miners; he headed the CIO 1938–1941. Lewis was an isolationist and broke with Roosevelt and endorsed his Republican opponent in the 1940 election, a position demanded by the pro-Soviet far left element in the CIO. Nevertheless, CIO members voted for Roosevelt and Lewis was forced to leave the CIO, taking his United Mine Workers of America union along.

City politics and machines

City Democratic machines had a new role to play. Traditionally the goal of winning power in the city was facilitated by keeping the vote low and under close watch. As part of the national New Deal coalition, the machines had to carry the state's electoral vote. That required turning out the largest possible majorities. They did this by converting some Republicans, mobilizing large numbers who had never voted before. Milton Rakove states: "Holding the South and delivering thumping majorities in the big cities of the North insured national hegemony for the Democratic party." The new majorities did not matter in the great 1936 landslide, but they were decisive in 1940.  A third of the electorate lived in the 106 cities with a population of 100,000 or more. They were 61% for FDR. The South had a sixth of the electorate and FDR won 73%. The remaining half of the electorate--the non-metropolitan North--voted 53% for the Republican Wendell Willkie. The largest possible landslide was needed, and the city machines came through in 1940, 1944, and 1948.   In the 1920s strong big city Republican machines were common. During the Great Depression their support plunged, and they were displaced by Democratic machines in Philadelphia, Pittsburgh, Chicago, St. Louis, and elsewhere. Across the urban North blacks deserted the GOP and were welcomed into the Democratic machine. 

Ethnics and Catholics were concentrated in large cities, which gave them a more Democratic hue. The 103 largest cities with a population of 100,000 or more in 1950 were Democratic strongholds, typically with former machines that had faded away during and after World War II.  The  largest cities averaged 66% for FDR in 1932 and 1936, compared to 58% of the rest of the country.  The cities dropped 5 points to 61% for FDR in 1940 and 1944, while the rest dropped 7 points to 51%.

Group voting: 1948–1964

Source: Gallup Polls in Gallup (1972)

Legacy
The big-city machines faded away in the 1940s with a few exceptions that lingered a bit such as Albany and Chicago. Local Democrats in most cities were heavily dependent on the WPA for patronage; when it ended in 1943, there was full employment and no replacement patronage source was created. Furthermore, World War II brought such a surge of prosperity that the relief mechanism of the New Deal was no longer needed.

Labor unions crested in size and power in the 1950s but then went into steady decline. They continue to be major backers of the Democrats, but with so few members, they have lost much of their influence. From the 1960s into the 1990s, many jobs moved to the Sun Belt free of union influences, and the Republican Party frequently painted unions as corrupt and ineffective.

Intellectuals gave increasing support to Democrats since 1932. The Vietnam War, however, caused a serious split, with the New Left unwilling to support most of the Democratic presidential nominees. Since the 1990s, the growing number of Americans with a post-graduate degree have supported Democrats.  In recent years, White Americans with a college degree have tended to support the Democratic Party, especially among younger voters, while non-college graduates are more likely to support the Republican Party—a reversal of the pattern before 2000.

White Southerners abandoned cotton and tobacco farming, and moved to the cities where the New Deal programs had much less impact. Beginning in the 1950s, the southern cities and suburbs started voting Republican. The White Southerners believed the support that northern Democrats gave to the Civil Rights Movement to be a direct political assault on their interests, which opened the way to protest votes for Barry Goldwater, who, in 1964, was the first Republican to carry the Deep South. Jimmy Carter and Bill Clinton lured many of the Southern Whites back at the level of presidential voting, but by 2000, White males in the South were 2–1 Republican and, indeed, formed a major part of the new Republican coalition. Since the 2010s, younger non-Evangelical White  Southerners with a college degree have been trending towards the Democratic Party, such as in Virginia, Georgia, and North Carolina.

The European ethnic groups came of age after the 1960s. Ronald Reagan pulled many of the working-class social conservatives into the Republican party as Reagan Democrats. Many middle-class ethnic minorities saw the Democratic party as a working class party, and preferred the GOP as the middle class party. In addition, while many supported the 1964 Civil Rights Act, they were generally opposed to racial integration, and also supported the Republican stance against rising urban crime. However, the Jewish community has continued to vote largely Democratic: 74% voted for the Democratic presidential candidate in 2004, 78% in 2008, and 69% in 2012.

African Americans grew stronger in their Democratic loyalties and in their numbers. From the 1930s into the 1960s, black voters in the North began trending Democrat, while those in the South were largely disenfranchised. Following the Civil Rights Movement in the 1960s, black voters became a much more important part of the Democrat voter base. Their Democratic loyalties have cut across all income and geographic lines to form the single most unified bloc of voters in the country, with over 87% of black voters voting for the Democratic presidential candidate since 2008.

See also
 Fifth Party System, 1930s-1970s
 Conservative coalition, opposition active by 1938
 Obama coalition, 21st century
 History of the United States Democratic Party

References

Further reading
 Allswang, John M. New Deal and American Politics (1978).
 Braik, Fethia. "New Deal for Minorities During the Great Depression." Journal of Political Science and International Relations 1.1 (2018): 20–24. online
 Burns, James MacGregor. Roosevelt: The Lion and the Fox (1956); a standard scholarly biography emphasizing politics; vol 1 online
 Burns, James MacGregor. Roosevelt: the soldier of freedom (1970) covers 1940-1945 vol 2 online
 Caughey, Devin, Michael C. Dougal, and Eric Schickler. "Policy and Performance in the New Deal Realignment: Evidence from old data and new methods." Journal of Politics 82.2 (2020): 494–508. online
 Caughey, Devin, Michael Dougal, and Eric Schickler. "The Policy Bases of the New Deal Realignment: Evidence from Public Opinion Polls, 1936–1952." Journal of Politics (2018).
 Caughey, Devin, and Christopher Warshaw. "The dynamics of state policy liberalism, 1936–2014." American Journal of Political Science 60.4 (2016): 899–913. online
 Chafe, William H. ed. Achievement of American Liberalism: The New Deal and Its Legacies 2003) 12 essays focusing on the issues
 Critchlow, Donald T. In Defense of Populism: Protest and American Democracy (U of Pennsylvania Press, 2020).
 Davies, Gareth, and Julian E. Zelizer, eds. America at the Ballot Box: Elections and Political History (2015) pp. 153–66, New Deal as issue in 1940 election.
 Gerstle, Gary, and Steve Fraser, eds. The Rise and Fall of the New Deal Order, 1930-1980 (Princeton University Press, 1989); 10 scholarly essays focused on the coalition online
 Howard, Donald S. WPA and federal relief policy (1943), 880pp; highly detailed report by the independent Russell Sage Foundation. online
 Isserman, Maurice, and Michael Kazin. America divided: The civil war of the 1960s (6th ed. Oxford UP, 2020).
 Janeway, Michael. The Fall of the House of Roosevelt: Brokers of Ideas and Power from FDR to LBJ (Columbia University Press, 2004). online 
 Jeffries, John W. Testing the Roosevelt coalition: Connecticut society and politics, 1940-1946 (Yale University, 1973).

 Jensen, Richard. "The Last Party System, 1932-1980," in Paul Kleppner, ed. Evolution of American Electoral Systems (1981).
 Kazin, Michael. What It Took to Win: A History of the Democratic Party  (2022)excerpt
 Lipset, Seymour Martin, ed. Party Coalitions in the 1980s (1981).
 Ladd Jr., Everett Carll with Charles D. Hadley. Transformations of the American Party System: Political Coalitions from the New Deal to the 1970s 2nd ed. (1978).
 Leuchtenburg, William E. "Franklin D. Roosevelt and the New Deal, 1932-1940." (1963), a standard scholarly survey online
 Leuchtenburg, William E. In the Shadow of FDR: From Harry Truman to George W. Bush (2001).
 Manza, Jeff  and Clem Brooks; Social Cleavages and Political Change: Voter Alignments and U.S. Party Coalitions, (1999).
 Mason, Robert. "Political Realignment." in A Companion to Richard M. Nixon (2011) pp: 252–269. online
 Milkis, Sidney M. and Jerome M. Mileur, eds. The New Deal and the Triumph of Liberalism (2002).
 Milkis, Sidney M. The President and the Parties: The Transformation of the American Party System Since the New Deal (1993).

  Mott, James Clinton. "The fate of an alliance: The Roosevelt coalition, 1932-1952" (PhD thesis,  University of Illinois at Chicago ProQuest Dissertations Publishing, 1988. 8821023) statistical reanalysis of Gallup polls.
 Nelson, Bruce. "'Give Us Roosevelt'--Workers and the New Deal Coalition." History Today 40.1 (1990): 40–48., popular history
 Nelson, Michael. "The Historical Presidency: Lost Confidence: The Democratic Party, the Vietnam War, and the 1968 Election." Presidential Studies Quarterly 48.3 (2018): 570-585.
 Norpoth, Helmut, Andrew H. Sidman, and Clara H. Suong. "Polls and Elections: The New Deal Realignment in Real Time." Presidential Studies Quarterly 43.1 (2013): 146–166. online
 Parmet, Herbert S. The Democrats: The years after FDR (1976) online
 Patterson, James. Congressional Conservatism and the New Deal: The Growth of the Conservative Coalition in Congress, 1933-39 (1967). online
 Patterson, James T. Grand Expectations: The United States, 1945-1974 (Oxford University Press, 1996), a standard scholarly survey.
 Radosh, Ronald. Divided They Fell: The Demise of the Democratic Party: 1964-1996 (Oxford University Press, 1996). online
 Reed Jr, Adolph. "Race and the Disruption of the New Deal Coalition." Urban Affairs Quarterly 27.2 (1991): 326–333.
 Riccards, Michael P., and Cheryl A. Flagg eds. Party Politics in the Age of Roosevelt: The Making of Modern America (2022) excerpt

 Rubin, Richard L. Party Dynamics, the Democratic Coalition and the Politics of Change (1976). online
 Savage, Sean J. Roosevelt: The Party Leader, 1932-1945 (University Press of Kentucky, 2014). online 
 Savage, Sean J. Truman and the Democratic Party (1997) online
 Schickler, Eric, and Devin Caughey, "Public Opinion, Organized Labor, and the Limits of New Deal Liberalism, 1936–1945," Studies in American Political Development, 25 (2011), 162–89. online
 Schlesinger, Arthur M., Jr. The Age Of Roosevelt, The Politics Of Upheaval (1957) online a major scholarly survey
 Scroop, Daniel Mark. Mr. Democrat: Jim Farley, the New Deal and the Making of Modern American Politics (University of Michigan Press, 2009). exderpt
 Singleton, Jeff. The American Dole: Unemployment Relief and the Welfare State in the Great Depression (2000)
 Sitkoff, Harvard. A New Deal for Blacks: The Emergence of Civil Rights as a National Issue, Vol. I: The Depression Decade (Oxford UP, 1979) online
 Smith, Jason Scott. Building New Deal Liberalism: the Political Economy of Public Works, 1933–1956 (2005)

 Sundquist, James L. Dynamics of the Party System: Alignment and Realignment of Political Parties in the United States (1983)
 Taylor, Nick. American-Made: The Enduring Legacy of the WPA: When FDR Put the Nation to Work (2008)  comprehensive history; 640pp excerpt

 
 Weiss, Nancy J. Farewell to the party of Lincoln: Black politics in the age of FDR (1983) online

Machines and localities
 Andersen, Kristi. The Creation of a Democratic Majority, 1928-1936 (1979), on Chicago.
 Boulay, Harvey, and Alan DiGaetano. "Why did political machines disappear?" Journal of Urban History 12.1 (1985): 25-49.
 DiGaetano, Alan. "Urban political reform: Did it kill the machine?" Journal of urban history 18.1 (1991): 37-67.
 Dorsett, Lyle W. Franklin D. Roosevelt and the City Bosses (1977), short survey of major machines online
 Eldersveld, Samuel J. "The Influence of Metropolitan Party Pluralities in Presidential Elections Since 1920: A Study of Twelve Key Cities" American Political Science Review 43#6 (1949), pp. 1189-1206 online
 Erie, Steven P. Rainbow's end: Irish-Americans and the dilemmas of urban machine politics, 1840-1985 (U of California Press, 1990).
 Gamm, Gerald H. The making of the New Deal Democrats: Voting behavior and realignment in Boston, 1920-1940 (U of Chicago Press, 1989).
 Gosnell, Harold. Machine politics: Chicago model (1937) online.
 Heineman, Kenneth J. Catholic New Deal: Religion and Reform in Depression Pittsburgh (Penn State Press, 2010).
 Jones, Gene Delon. "The Origin of the Alliance between the New Deal and the Chicago Machine" Journal of the Illinois State Historical Society 67#3 (1974), pp. 253-274 online 

 Lewis, Michael. "No Relief From Politics: Machine Bosses and Civil Works." Urban Affairs Quarterly 30.2 (1994): 210–226.
 Lubell, Samuel. The Future of American Politics (2nd ed. 1956). online
 Luconi, Stefano. "Machine politics and the consolidation of the Roosevelt majority: The case of Italian Americans in Pittsburgh and Philadelphia." Journal of American Ethnic History (1996): 32–59. online
 MacKay, Malcolm.  In With Flynn, The Boss Behind the President (2020), popular biography. excerpt
 Sheppard, Si. The Buying of the Presidency? Franklin D. Roosevelt, the New Deal, and the Election of 1936 (ABC-CLIO, 2014). excerpt
 Sheppard, Si. " 'If it wasn't for Roosevelt you wouldn't have this job': The Politics of Patronage and the 1936 Presidential Election in New York." New York History 95.1 (2014): 41–69. excerpt
 Shover, John L. "The emergence of a two-party system in Republican Philadelphia, 1924-1936." Journal of American History 60.4 (1974): 985–1002. online
 Stave, Bruce. The New Deal and the Last Hurrah: Pittsburgh Machine Politics (U of Pittsburgh Press, 1970).
 Stave, Bruce. "The New Deal, The Last Hurrah, and the Building of an Urban Political Machine" Pennsylvania History 33.4 (1966): 460–483. online
 Sugrue, Thomas J. "Crabgrass-roots politics: Race, rights, and the reaction against liberalism in the urban north, 1940–1964." Journal of American History 82.2 (1995): 551–578. online
 Trout, Charles H. Boston, the Great Depression, and the New Deal (1977).
 Williams, Mason B. City of Ambition: FDR, LaGuardia, and the Making of Modern New York (WW Norton, 2013).
 Zeitz, Joshua M.  White Ethnic New York: Jews, Catholics, and the Shaping of Postwar Politics (2007).

Historiography
 Blake, William. "The New Deal: Retrospection, Realignment, or a Reconstituted Polity?." (2020). online
 Salvatore, Nick, and Jefferson Cowie. "The Long Exception: Rethinking the Place of the New Deal in American History." International Labor and Working Class History 74 (Fall 2008) : 3‐32. online
 Shafer, Byron E., ed. The End of Realignment?: Interpreting American Electoral Eras (U of Wisconsin Press, 1991).
 Sitkoff, Harvard, ed. Fifty Years Later: The New Deal Evaluated (Temple University Press, 1985).
 Sternsher, Bernard. "The New Deal party system: A reappraisal." Journal of Interdisciplinary History 15.1 (1984): 53–81. online

Primary sources
 Cantril, Hadley and Mildred Strunk, eds.; Public Opinion, 1935–1946 (1951), massive compilation of many public opinion polls online
Flynn, Edward J. You're the boss (1947); Edward J. Flynn was a boss in New York City and, with Farley, FDR's patronage advisor. online

 Gallup, George. The Gallup Poll: Public opinion, 1935-1971 (3 vol 1972) vol 1 online 1935-1948).
 Robinson, Edgar Eugene. They Voted for Roosevelt: The Presidential Vote, 1932-1944 (1947) tables of votes by county.

External links
Machine Politics essay by Roger Biles @ the Chicago Historical Society's Electronic Encyclopedia of Chicago

New Deal
History of the Democratic Party (United States)
Democratic Party (United States)
Centre-left politics
Liberalism in the United States
Political history of the United States
Presidency of Franklin D. Roosevelt
Factions in the Democratic Party (United States)